Paul Wells (born 1966) is a Canadian journalist and pundit.

Paul Wells may also refer to:

Paul Wells (musician) (1888–1927), American pianist and composer
Paul Wells (sound engineer) (1930–2005), American sound engineer
Paul Wells, character in the American TV series Last Resort